Helena Island is one of the uninhabited members of the Queen Elizabeth Islands of the Canadian Arctic islands in the Qikiqtaaluk Region of Nunavut, Canada. It is along the northern coast of Bathurst Island, separated by Sir William Parker Strait. Seymour Island is located off its west coast.

Its major landmarks are Devereaux Point in the north, Noel Point in the west, and Cape Robert Smart in the south.

References

External links
 Helena Island in the Atlas of Canada - Toporama; Natural Resources Canada

Islands of the Queen Elizabeth Islands
Uninhabited islands of Qikiqtaaluk Region